Yellow Face is a semi-autobiographical play by David Henry Hwang, featuring the author himself as the protagonist, DHH, mounting his 1993 play Face Value. The play's themes include questions of race and of the interaction between media and politics.

Production history
Yellow Face premiered in Los Angeles at the Mark Taper Forum in association with East West Players in May 2007.

The play opened Off-Broadway at the Joseph Papp Public Theater on December 10, 2007, and closed on January 13, 2008. Directed by Leigh Silverman, the cast featured Hoon Lee and Noah Bean as the leads. Hwang won his third Obie Award in Playwriting, and he was a third-time finalist for the Pulitzer Prize for Drama.

In 2013, the play was produced as a two-part YouTube video directed and adapted by Jeff Liu, starring Ryun Yu as DHH, Sab Shimono as HYH, and Christopher Gorham as Marcus G. Dahlman, with the rest of the cast played by Ki Hong Lee, Emily Kuroda, Linda Park, Justin James Hughes, Michael Krawic, and Tracy Winters.

In 2013, Yellow Face made its UK premiere at Park Theatre in Finsbury Park, London, on May 21, produced by Special Relationship Productions and directed by Alex Sims. This production transferred to the Royal National Theatre on May 5, 2014.

In June/July 2022, the play was produced by Theatre Raleigh and directed by Telly Leung. The production featured Hansel Tan as DHH, Alan Ariano as Henry Y Hwang, and Pascal Pastrana as Marcus G. Dahlman. The production also featured Lighting Design by Charlie Raschke and Scenic design by Mayuki Su. 

The play is currently published by Theatre Communications Group and in an acting edition by Dramatists Play Service, Inc.

The fictionalized DHH also appears in Hwang's musical Soft Power.

Background
In an interview, Hwang explained: "It’s a memoir – a kind of unreliable memoir. The main character is named after me and based on me. There are some things in it that are true and there are some things in it that aren’t true. ... The story of 'Yellow Face' dates back to the 'Miss Saigon' controversy in 1990. That was when I was involved in the big casting controversy... I just naturally tend to write humorously, and for me, it’s not an issue of trying to write lines that are funny. I don’t think that works. It’s having a situation that’s inherently comic and then trying to be truthful to the character in that situation."

Plot summary
Yellow Face opens with DHH receiving an E-mail from Marcus G. Dahlman in 2006 about his recent travels in China. DHH reflects on how Marcus disappeared from the public eye. He begins in 1990 with the controversy over the casting of Jonathan Pryce, a white Welsh actor, in an Asian role in Miss Saigon as the musical transfers from London to New York City. Although DHH receives a lot of publicity about his protests against the casting and yellow face makeup, especially as the first Asian-American playwright to win a Tony Award (for M. Butterfly), the production of Miss Saigon ultimately continues without changes to the cast.

DHH then writes the play Face Value, based partly on the Miss Saigon controversy, and casts Marcus G. Dahlman as one of the lead Asian roles in his play. DHH is at first convinced that Marcus is part Asian but eventually realizes he is fully white. DHH fears he will appear hypocritical for the casting after his protest of yellow face, but is unable to fire Marcus on the basis of his race. DHH has him adopt the name "Marcus Gee" and tells the public that Marcus has Eurasian ancestry as a Jew with Siberian ancestry. Though their deception is successful, Face Value receives negative reviews and closes in previews, losing $2 million. DHH tries to move on, but he later discovers that Marcus has continued playing his role as an Asian in all parts of his life, acting in Asian roles and becoming an activist for Asian American rights. This angers DHH, who views him as an "ethnic tourist".

The play further explores DHH's relationship to his father, HYH, and the relationship of the Chinese American community to America. HYH is a successful immigrant who built the Far East National Bank in California. After contributing monetarily to political campaigns, he and others affiliated with the bank, including Wen Ho Lee, get investigated by Senator Fred Thompson, who believes they are funneling money from China to influence American politics. In the course of this, DHH and Marcus get implicated as Chinese collaborators. DHH beseeches Marcus to reveal his true identity as white, deciding he cares more about defending the Chinese American community than hiding his mistakes. Marcus ends his deception, and Thompson's investigation breaks down.

DHH's father dies in 2005, having lost faith in the American Dream. DHH and Marcus converse after their E-mails, before DHH admits to the audience that Marcus is an entirely fictional character he created to explore messy questions about race and nationality. At the character’s request, DHH writes Marcus a "happy ending" in which he moves to a small village in China and is eventually accepted into the community there.

Casts

Original UK Cast, Park Theatre and Royal National Theatre

See also
Portrayal of East Asians in Hollywood

References

External links
 

Plays by David Henry Hwang
Obie Award recipients
2007 plays
Off-Broadway plays
Satirical plays
Plays based on actual events
Plays about race and ethnicity
Plays set in New York City